The Trier University of Applied Sciences (German: Hochschule Trier) is a University of Applied Sciences (German: "Fachhochschule") located in Trier, Birkenfeld and Idar-Oberstein (Germany).  With 7,000 students the Trier University of Applied Sciences is divided into three campuses in Trier (main campus Schneidershof), Birkenfeld (Environmental Campus Birkenfeld), and Idar-Oberstein (jewellery design). The Trier University of Applied Sciences must not be confused with the University of Trier (German: "Universität Trier").

History

The Trier University of Applied Sciences originally developed from the Staatliche Ingenieurschule für das Bau- und Maschinenwesen Trier and the Werkkunstschule Trier.  In 1971, it became a part of the Fachhochschule Rheinland-Pfalz, and became independent in 1996.

Areas of study
The Trier University of Applied Sciences is divided into 7 areas of study (Fachbereich).  Two of these areas are at the Environmental Campus Birkenfeld, and gemstone and jewelry design are in the town of Idar-Oberstein.  The areas of study are:
 BLV: consists of civil engineering, food technology, and supply engineering
 Design: includes architecture, interior architecture, fashion design, communication design, intermedia design and gemstone & jewellery design.
 Business school: business administration, information systems, international business
 Informatics: computer science
 Technology: consists of electrical engineering, mechanical engineering, and industrial engineering
 Environmental Planning & Technology: at the Environmental Campus Birkenfeld
 Environmental Economics & Law: at the Environmental Campus Birkenfeld

See also
 Environmental Campus Birkenfeld

References

External links
 Official website (English)

Universities and colleges in Rhineland-Palatinate
University of Applied Sciences
Universities of Applied Sciences in Germany